Busara was a literary journal published quarterly by the East African Publishing House, and later biannually, by the English Department at the University of Nairobi. It was first published under that name in 1968, and became one of the most influential literary journals of its time in Kenya. Jared Angira became its editor in chief in 1969.

Originally the journal was founded as Nexus, and four issues appeared in 1967 and 1968, but it was renamed in 1968: "Busara" means "wisdom" in Kiswahili. Awori wa Kataka and Richard Gacheche were its first editors under that name; the choice for a Kiswahili name was influenced by other publications doing the same thing at a time when there was broad discussion in newly-independent Kenya about a national language.

Notable contributors and editorial staff included Taban lo Liyong, Grace Ogot, Adrian Roscoe, Angus Calder, and Ngũgĩ wa Thiong'o, Jared Angira, and Chris Wanjala.

References

Kenyan literature
Literary magazines
Magazines established in 1967
Magazines with year of disestablishment missing
Magazines disestablished in 1975
Quarterly magazines